The grand duke of Luxembourg is the monarchical head of state of Luxembourg.  Luxembourg has been a grand duchy since 15 March 1815, when it was created from territory of the former Duchy of Luxembourg.  It was in personal union with the United Kingdom of the Netherlands until 1890 under the House of Orange-Nassau.  Luxembourg is the world's only sovereign Grand Duchy and since 1815, there have been nine monarchs, including the incumbent, Henri.

Constitutional role
The constitution of Luxembourg defines the grand duke's position:
The grand duke is the head of state, symbol of its unity, and guarantor of national independence. He exercises executive power in accordance with the constitution and the laws of the country.

After a constitutional change (to article 34) in December 2008 resulting from Henri's refusal to assent to a law legalizing euthanasia, laws now no longer require the grand duke's formal assent (implying "approval") but his task of promulgating the law as chief executive remains.

Compensation
The grand duke does not receive a salary, but the grand ducal family receives annually 300,000 gold francs (€281,000) for grand ducal functions. In 2017, the Luxembourg budget included €10.1 million for the grand duke's household costs.

Succession

Succession to the throne was governed by Salic law, as dictated by the Nassau Family Pact, first adopted on 30 June 1783. The right to reign over Luxembourg was until June 2011 passed by agnatic-cognatic primogeniture within the House of Nassau, as stipulated under the 1815 Final Act of the Congress of Vienna and as confirmed by the 1867 Treaty of London. The Nassau Family Pact itself can be amended by the usual legislative process, having been so on 10 July 1907 to exclude the Count of Merenberg branch of the House, which was descended from a morganatic marriage.

An heir apparent may be granted the style 'hereditary grand duke'. The current heir apparent is Hereditary Grand Duke Guillaume. In June 2011, agnatic primogeniture was replaced with absolute primogeniture, allowing any legitimate female descendants within the House of Nassau to be included in the line of succession.

Full titles
The traditional titulatures of the grand duke are By the Grace of God, Grand Duke of Luxembourg, Duke of Nassau, Count Palatine of the Rhine, Count of Sayn, Königstein, Katzenelnbogen and Diez, Burgrave of Hammerstein, Lord of Mahlberg, Wiesbaden, Idstein, Merenberg, Limburg and Eppstein. 

It should, however, be noted that many of the titles are held without regard to the strict rules of Salic inheritance and that most, save for Grand Duke of Luxembourg and Duke of Nassau, are simply not used.

List of grand dukes

House of Orange-Nassau

House of Nassau-Weilburg
Under the 1783 Nassau Family Pact, those territories of the Nassau family in the Holy Roman Empire at the time of the pact (Luxembourg and Nassau) were bound by semi-Salic law, which allowed inheritance by females or through the female line only upon extinction of male members of the dynasty. When William III died leaving only his daughter Wilhelmina as an heir, the crown of the Netherlands, not being bound by the family pact, passed to Wilhelmina. However, the crown of Luxembourg passed to a male of another branch of the House of Nassau: Adolphe, the dispossessed Duke of Nassau and head of the branch of Nassau-Weilburg.

In 1905, Grand Duke Adolphe's younger half-brother, Prince Nikolaus Wilhelm of Nassau, died, having left a son Georg Nikolaus, Count von Merenberg who was, however, the product of a morganatic marriage, and therefore not legally a member of the House of Nassau.  In 1907, Adolphe's only son, William IV, Grand Duke of Luxembourg, obtained passage of a law confirming the right of his eldest daughter, Marie-Adélaïde, to succeed to the throne in virtue of the absence of any remaining dynastic males of the House of Nassau, as originally stipulated in the Nassau Family Pact. She became the grand duchy's first reigning female monarch upon her father's death in 1912, and upon her own abdication in 1919, was succeeded by her younger sister Charlotte, who married Felix of Bourbon-Parma, a prince of the former Duchy of Parma.  Charlotte's descendants have since reigned as the continued dynasty of Nassau, and also constitute a cadet branch of the House of Bourbon-Parma.

Grand ducal consorts

 Princess Wilhelmine of Prussia (first wife of Grand Duke William I)
 Grand Duchess Anna Pavlovna of Russia (wife of Grand Duke William II)
 Princess Sophie of Württemberg (first wife of Grand Duke William III)
 Princess Emma of Waldeck and Pyrmont (second wife of Grand Duke William III)
 Princess Adelheid-Marie of Anhalt-Dessau (wife of Grand Duke Adolphe)
 Infanta Marie Anne of Portugal (wife of Grand Duke William IV)
 Prince Felix of Bourbon-Parma (husband of Grand Duchess Charlotte)
 Princess Joséphine Charlotte of Belgium (wife of Grand Duke Jean)
 María Teresa Mestre y Batista (wife of Grand Duke Henri)

See also
 Grand Ducal Family of Luxembourg

References

External links

 

 
 
1815 establishments in Germany